The Muscatine Micropolitan Statistical Area, as defined by the United States Census Bureau, is an area consisting of two counties in east central Iowa, anchored by the city of Muscatine. The Muscatine Micropolitan Statistical Area is also a part of the Davenport-Moline, IA-IL Combined Statistical Area (CSA), which has a population of 474,226, making it the 90th-largest CSA in the nation.

As of the 2000 census, the area had a population of 53,905 (though a July 1, 2009 estimate placed the population at 54,179).

Counties
Louisa
Muscatine

Communities

Places with more than 20,000 inhabitants
Muscatine (Principal city)

Places with 1,000 to 5,000 inhabitants
Columbus Junction
Wapello
West Liberty
Wilton (partial)

Places with 500 to 1,000 inhabitants
Fruitland
Grandview
Morning Sun

Places with less than 500 inhabitants
Atalissa
Blue Grass (partial)
Columbus City
Conesville 
Cotter
Durant (partial)
Fredonia
Letts
Nichols 
Oakville
Stockton
Walcott (partial)

Unincorporated places
Cranston
Cairo
Fairport
Montpelier
Moscow
Newport
Petersburg

Townships

Louisa County

 Columbus City
 Concord
 Eliot
 Elm Grove
 Grandview
 Jefferson

 Marshall
 Morning Sun
 Oakland
 Port Louisa
 Union
 Wapello

Muscatine County

 Bloomington
 Cedar
 Fruitland
 Fulton
 Goshen
 Lake
 Montpelier
 Moscow

 Muscatine
 Orono
 Pike
 Seventy-Six
 Sweetland
 Wapsinonoc
 Wilton

Demographics
As of the census of 2000, there were 53,905 people, 20,366 households, and 14,599 families residing within the μSA. The racial makeup of the μSA was 91.44% White, 0.60% African American, 0.28% Native American, 0.68% Asian, 0.02% Pacific Islander, 5.71% from other races, and 1.26% from two or more races. Hispanic or Latino of any race were 12.08% of the population.

The median income for a household in the μSA was $40,445, and the median income for a family was $46,173. Males had a median income of $33,811 versus $23,439 for females. The per capita income for the μSA was $18,635.

See also
Iowa census statistical areas

References

 
Muscatine County, Iowa
Louisa County, Iowa